Mark Philippoussis won the title, defeating Àlex Corretja 7–6(7–3), 1–6, 6–4 in the final.

Slava Doseděl was the defending champion, but was defeated by Mark Philippoussis in the semifinals.

Seeds

  Thomas Enqvist (second round)
  Carlos Moyà (quarterfinals)
  Wayne Ferreira (second round)
  Félix Mantilla (first round)
  Alberto Berasategui (second round)
  Àlex Corretja (final)
  Marc Rosset (semifinals)
  Mark Philippoussis (champion)

Draw

Finals

Top half

Bottom half

External links
 1997 BMW Open Singles draw

Singles